Formosa undariae is a Gram-negative, aerobic and rod-shaped bacterium from the genus Formosa. It has been isolated from a brown algae reservoir in South Korea.

References

Flavobacteria
Bacteria described in 2013